Sir John D'Oyly (1702 – 1773) was the 4th and last D'Oyly baronet of Chislehampton.

Early life and education
John D'Oyly was the son of Sir John D'Oyly, 2nd Baronet of Chislehampton and Susanna Putt. He was educated at John Roysse's Free School in Abingdon, (now Abingdon School) and later Merton College, Oxford (fellow and Master of Arts).

Career
He was Rector of Cuxham, Oxfordshire.

Peerage
He succeeded his brother Sir Thomas D'Oyly, 3rd Baronet, to the title in 1759, was unmarried and the baronetcy became extinct upon his death in 1773.

See also
 List of Old Abingdonians

References

1702 births
1773 deaths
People educated at Abingdon School
Alumni of Merton College, Oxford
Baronets in the Baronetage of England